Kim Min-jun or Kim Min-joon (김민준) may refer to:

Kim Min-june (footballer, born January 1994), South Korean footballer, playing for Gimhae
Kim Min-jun (footballer, born March 1994), South Korean footballer, playing for Gyeongju HNP
Kim Min-jun (footballer, born 1996), South Korean footballer
Kim Min-jun (footballer, born January 2000), South Korean footballer, playing for Gyeongnam
Kim Min-jun (footballer, born February 2000), South Korean footballer, playing for Ulsan Hyundai
Kim Min-jun (actor) (born 1976), South Korean actor
Kim Min-jun (cyclist), South Korean cyclist who competed at the 2010 Asian Junior Cycling Championships
Jun. K (Kim Min-jun; born 1988), South Korean musical artist

See also
Kim Jung-min (disambiguation)